Oru Indian Pranayakadha is a 2013 Malayalam-language romantic comedy film written by Ikbal Kuttipuram and directed by Sathyan Anthikad starring Fahadh Faasil and Amala Paul. The film was a sleeper hit despite competition from Drishyam.

Plot
Oru Indian Pranayakadha is a love story which shows the relationship between a trickish person named Aymanam Sidharthan and a disciplined Canadian citizen of Malayali origin named Irene Gardner. In the beginning, the story shows the political life of Sidharthan. He is the local youth wing leader political outfit. Protege of the district president of the party, Uthup Vallikkadan, Sidharthan hopes to make it big in politics . However, his dreams are shattered when the party High command decides to nominate the daughter of one of the party's senior leader's daughter named Vimala Ramanathan. This leads the young politician in despair. During this time the girl Irene Gardner visits Kerala to shoot a documentary. She is in search of an assistant to help her in shoot the film and approaches Uthup. Uthup requests Sidharthan to meet her and assist her. Sidharthan unwillingly went but when Irene promises INR 2000 per day for the assistant, so Siddharthan, who has financial issues, agrees to help her.

During this time Irene then is called by the police for a passport verification. Sidharthan begins to doubt her motives for coming to India. Irene reveals the secret that she has actually come in search for her birth parents. She is an adopted child. Her parents revealed that to her. So she decided to find out her birth parents. Sidharthan agrees to help her; they start their investigation. They come to know that a railway porter who know more about her past . They meet him but he refused to reveal what he knows, but at last he revealed that she is her parents’ illegitimate daughter. Irene decides to meet her parents without letting them know that she is their daughter. Meanwhile, Sidharthan breaks up with his girlfriend Divya who is going to marry an IAS officer.

Later, Irene finds out her birth mother is an ayurvedic doctor named Dr. Thulasi and they visit as a patient telling her that they're married and Irene lives at her mother's hospital for some time. Meanwhile, Sidharthan begins to fall in love with Irene, but neither is aware of this at present. They then discover her birth father's identity. His name is Azad and they go to Rajasthan to meet him. They approach her father is by telling that they're couple from Kerala. During their stay, they participate in Irene's half-sister's wedding and then return to Kerala. Irene then decides to go back to Canada, which Sidharthan does not agree with, as they have realized they are in love with each other. On airport Sidharthan gifts her a laminated photos of her parents and Irene also gifts him a book .

Two years later, Sidharthan is shown as a successful politician and he also completed his LLB. Irene comes back to India and decides to stay and both of them reunite.

Cast 

 Fahadh Faasil as Aymanam Sidharthan
 Amala Paul as Irene Gardner
 Innocent as Uthup Vallikkadan
 Shafna as Divya
 Neeraj Madhav as Charlie
 Muthumani  as Dr. Vimala Ramanathan
 Krishna Praba as Sudha, Sidharth's sister
 Gopalan as Shivaraman
 Valsala Menon as Sidharth's grandmother
 Babu Annur as Sethumadhavan, Sidharth's Father
 Kani Kusruti as SP Jayalakshmi  IPS
 Lakshmi Gopalaswamy as Dr. Thulasi
 Prakash Bare as Azad
 Anu Sithara as Young Thulasi (cameo)
 Rohit Menon as young Azad (cameo)
 Kala as Sidharth's Mother
 Riya Saira as Merin
 Rony David as SI Shankar
 Nisha Sarang as Sivaraman's wife
 Anjana Appukuttan as Irene's neighbour
 Ancy as Divya's mother
 Antony as Divya's father
 Rahul Ravi as Johan
 Janaki as Swathi
 Raj Pranav as Village boy
 Arun Nair as Roopesh
 Dilip as Benny
 Abijith Paul
 Thiruvalla Bhasi as Varkky Chettan
 M. G. Sasi as Dr. Sunil Kumar

Production
For this film, Fahadh Faasil worked with Sathyan Anthikad for the first time. Unlike his previous movies, Sathyan Anthikad announced the title of the movie at the beginning of filming. The film was shot in and around Kottayam in Kerala and some portions in Jaisalmer, Rajasthan.

Soundtrack

Vidyasagar composed the music; he associated with director Sathyan Anthikad for the first time, replacing maestro Ilaiyaraaja who had composed the music score for 10 of the last 12 movies directed by Sathyan. The film had four songs.

Reception

Oru Indian Pranyakatha is said to have grossed around 3.3 crore in 10 days of its release from Kerala box office. The film was commercial and critical success. The film completed 125 days in theatres.

Awards
Kerala State Film Award 2013
 Kerala State Film Award for Best Editor - K. Rajagopal
Asianet Film Awards 2013
 Best Actress - Amala Paul

South Indian International Movie Awards 2013
  Best Actress (Malayalam) – Amala Paul

Vanitha Film Awards
  Best Popular Actress – Amala Paul

References

External links
 

Films shot in Rajasthan
2013 films
2010s Malayalam-language films
2013 romantic comedy films
Films directed by Sathyan Anthikad
Indian political satire films
Films scored by Vidyasagar